Composer Giorgis Koutsourelis was born at Kissamos, Crete in 1914. He composed "Armenohorianos Syrtos", whose theme formed the basis of the song written by Mikis Theodorakis popularly known as "Zorba's dance".  He died in Kissamos in June 1994.

References

External links 
 https://web.archive.org/web/20070223184705/http://www.cretanmusic.gr/index.php?file=artists

1914 births
1994 deaths
Greek composers
Cretan musicians
People from Kissamos
20th-century composers